The Albany State Golden Rams are the athletic sports teams for Albany State University, located in Albany, Georgia, in NCAA Division II intercollegiate sports. The Golden Rams compete as members of the Southern Intercollegiate Athletic Conference (SIAC). Starting Fall 2019, Women's soccer will be competing as an associate member in the Peach Belt Conference (PBC).

Sports sponsored
A member of the Southern Intercollegiate Athletic Conference, Albany State University sponsors teams in four men's and seven women's NCAA sanctioned sports.

Football

Championships

SIAC
 Baseball (1991 • 1994 • 2000 · 2001 · 2002 · 2003 · 2004 • 2006 • 2010 • 2015 • 2018)
 Men's Basketball (1973 • 1983 · 1984 · 1985 • 1992 • 1997 • 2007)
 Women's Basketball (1980 • 1981 • 1987 • 1989 • 1990, 1996 • 1998 • 2015
 Men's Cross Country (1976 • 1977 • 1979 • 1980 · 1981 · 1982 · 1983 · 1984 · 1985 · 1986)
 Women's Cross Country (1982 • 1998 • 2004 · 2005 · 2006 · 2007 · 2008 • 2010)
 Football (1984 · 1985 · 1986 • 1988 • 1993 · 1994 · 1995 · 1996 · 1997 • 2003 · 2004 · 2005 · 2006 • 2010 • 2013)
 Softball (2005 • 2007 • 2008 • 2010 • 2013 • 2018)
 Women's Tennis (2010) 
 Men's Track and Field (1972 · 1973 · 1974 · 1975 · 1976 · 1977 · 1978 • 1980 · 1981 · 1982 · 1983 · 1984 · 1985 · 1986 ·1987 • 2003 · 2004 · 2005 • 2014)
 Women's Track and Field (1997 • 1999 · 2000 • 2005 · 2006 · 2007 · 2008 · 2009 • 2011 • 2012 • 2014)
 Women's Volleyball (1998 • 2001 · 2002 · 2003 · 2004 · 2005 · 2006 · 2007 · 2008 · 2009)
 Men's Golf (2017 • 2018)

SEAC
Football (1955 • 1957 • 1959 • 1960 • 1962 • 1966)

Black College National Championships
Football (2003 • 2004 • 2010)
Baseball (2018)

References

External links